Oedipina pseudouniformis is a species of salamander in the family Plethodontidae.
It is found in Costa Rica and Nicaragua.
Its natural habitats are subtropical or tropical moist lowland forests, subtropical or tropical moist montane forests, plantations, and heavily degraded former forest.
It is threatened by habitat loss.

References

Oedipina
Taxonomy articles created by Polbot
Amphibians described in 1968